The 1963 Memphis State Tigers football team represented Memphis State College (now known as the University of Memphis) as an independent during the 1963 NCAA University Division football season. In its sixth season under head coach Billy J. Murphy, the team compiled a 9–0–1 record and outscored opponents by a total of 199 to 52. Richard Saccoccia was the team captain. The team played its home games at Crump Stadium in Memphis, Tennessee.

The team's statistical leaders included Russell Vollmer with 466 passing yards, fullback Dave Casinelli with 1,016 rushing yards and 84 points scored, and Bob Sherlag with 183 receiving yards.

Schedule

References

Memphis State
Memphis Tigers football seasons
College football undefeated seasons
Memphis State Tigers football